Old Moybologue Cemetery is a circular enclosure in County Cavan, Ireland. The site dates from the Early Christian Period and features the ruins of a mediaeval church and a graveyard.

Description 
The graveyard is surrounded by a dry-stone wall and forms part of a much larger ecclesiastical enclosure, which includes the remains of a well-preserved twelfth century Norman motte in a field to the west. Not much is known of the church except that a hospital or hospice existed here during the medieval period. Medieval hospices provided food and rest to travellers as well as taking care of the sick or dying. By the time the Barony of Clankee map was drawn up in 1604, the church at Moybologue was already in ruin and was depicted without a roof and situated next to a tower, likely a belfry.

At present, only a part of the north wall of the nave survives of the church. This is joined to a roofless transept which served as a priest's residence. The transept consists of two stories and features hood-moulding on the window on the upper floor. There is also evidence of a fireplace in the structure.

There are over 350 headstones or grave markers in the cemetery; including a cupmarked/bullaun stone, two grave slabs, two cross slabs, three churchyard crosses, a font, a holed stone and an inscribed stone.

In 2020, Moybologue Historical Society secured funding from the Community Monuments Fund to carry out lime mortar restoration of the stonework in and around the graveyard. An interpretative panel was also added at this time.

Old Moybologue Cemetery is a part of Cavan Historic Graveyards Network.

Location 
Old Moybologue Cemetery is located in the townland of Relaghabeg, Co. Cavan, about 5 km from Bailieborough. The new cemetery, which opened in 1952, can be found less than 1 km to the North East. The modern church is St. Patricks Roman Catholic church in Tierworker, on the border with Co. Meath.

References 

Religion in County Cavan
Cemeteries in the Republic of Ireland